Cooch Behar is the district headquarters and the largest town of Cooch Behar district in the Indian state of West Bengal. The name Cooch Behar is derived from two words—Cooch, a corrupted form of the word Koch, the name of the Koch tribes, and the word behar is derived from vihara meaning land, Koch Behar means land of the Koches.

The Historical Kamtapur comprises the total North Bengal maximum parts of Assam, some parts of present Bangladesh and few parts of Bhutan.

Historical evidence
In the olden days a greater part of the Kamrup made up the Koch state. The state of Kamrup was made up of four Pithas. Out of that Cooch Behar was a part of Ratna Pitha. In the beginning of the 16th Century, this state emerged as a powerful kingdom. In the beginning this state was known as Pragjyotish, Lohitya, Kamrup, Kamta, etc. In Bhaskar Verma's Tamralipi we found the name of 'Kamrup'. In the travel logs of Xuanzang and Harischaritra we also discover the name of Kamrup. In 1586 British businessman Ralph Fich have stated the name 'Couch'. In Akbarnama we also found the name of 'Koch'. Stephen Casilla have stated the name 'Coch' and the capital as 'Biar'. In the 17th Century Von Dan Brooke's map there is a place mentioned as 'Ragiawerra Cosbhaar'. In one of the description by a Dutch Sailor we found the name 'Kosbia'.

In the 'Bishwakosh' (Bengali for Encyclopedia) written by Nagendra Nath Bose, he stated that in the beginning the state of Cooch Behar was first stated as 'Bihar'. Later to distinguish between Mughal occupied province of Bihar the name of the state was changed to Koch Bihar, but this theory have some doubts as well. The kings of Koch dynasty such as Biswa Singha, Nara Narayan, Pran Narayan, etc. have their title of 'Kamteshwar'. The state of Cooch behar have been stated in various book, in different times as 'Bihar' or 'Behar' or 'Nijo Behar'. Even in the Cooch Behar Royal Government's letters, Notices, records, deeds, etc. we can see these names. But there are many theories or stories behind the naming of Cooch Behar.

Possible causes
 The word Cooch Behar means the area where Koch people move about or stay.
 The word may have been given for the area where Kochkumari and Mahadev moved about.
 To distinguish from the Mughal occupied province of 'Bihar'.
 From the Bengali word 'Krore' to 'Koch'. In the fear of Parshuram the Khatriyas took shelter in the 'Krore' or 'Koch' of Bhagabati.
 From the Bengali word 'sankoch' or fear to koch. To bring out the fearing condition of the Khatriyas from Parashuram.
 Many people say that due to the situation on the bank of the Sankosh River it had turn from 'kosh' to 'koch'.
 From 'Kochk' to 'Kock'. In Dhruvananda Mishra's Kulkarika, the residents of 'Kochok' have been named 'Koch'..
 The Buddhist monasteries are called 'Bihar'. It is estimation that there was an influence of Buddhism in the area.
 Many Kings of Koch Bihar have been named 'Bihareshwar'.
 In the Tantra Books the name of Cooch Behar is 'Kochbadhupur'. It is told that this area is a favourite area of Mahadev to roam about or bihar.
 According to Buknan the name may have come from the Kush grass.

The history of the official present name
In the times of East India Company the following English spellings were used such as:
Cooch-Bihar, Coss-Beyhar, Kuch Behar, Kutch-Behar, Cooch-Behaar, Cooch-Behar, Kooch-Behar, Koch-Bihar, Koch Vihar, Koosh-Beyhar, etc.

The Bengali names are as follows:
কোচবিহার, কুচবিহার, কঁুচবিহার, কোচবেহার, etc.

The debate behind the names has still not stopped. Officially and non-officially in both Bengali and English various names are used. To stop these spelling doubts Maharaja Nipendra Narayan on 13 April 1896. published a notice in the Cooch Behar Gazette. The Notice was as below:
Cooch Behar Gazette
Page 28, Part I 1896
Dt. 13.4.1896 
Notice by the superintendent of the State
His Highness the Maharaja Bhup Bahadur having signified his approval of the use of the spelling 'Cooch Behar', all other spelling of the word should be dropped. 
								D.R. Lyall
Superintendent of the State
Cooch Behar.
Nowadays only the English spelling Cooch Behar and in Bengali কোচবিহার is used. But still the Cooch Behar Palace Tickets and the sign board displays the name 'Koch Bihar' which is now maintained by Archaeological Survey of India.

References

Sources
 Translation of Itikathai Kochbihar by Dr. Nripendranath Pal

History of Cooch Behar
Cooch Behar
Cooch Behar
Cooch Behar